Satin Doll: Dedicated to Duke Ellington is a solo album by American jazz pianist Hank Jones recorded in 1976 for the Japanese Trio label. The album consists of one side of compositions by Duke Ellington and one of popular big band tunes.

Reception

Allmusic awarded the album 3 stars.

Track listing
 "Just Squeeze Me (But Please Don't Tease Me)" (Duke Ellington, Lee Gaines) - 3:27
 "In a Sentimental Mood" (Ellington, Manny Kurtz, Irving Mills) - 2:31
 "Satin Doll" (Ellington, Billy Strayhorn, Johnny Mercer) - 3:37 		
 "Prelude to a Kiss" (Ellington, Irving Gordon, Mills) - 3:57
 "What Am I Here For?" (Ellington, Frankie Laine) - 3:38
 "Do Nothing Till You Hear from Me" (Ellington, Bob Russell) - 3:37
 "Sophisticated Lady" (Ellington, Mills, Mitchell Parish) - 2:34
 "Oh! Look at Me Now" (Joe Bushkin, John DeVries) - 3:12
 "Alone Together" (Howard Dietz, Arthur Schwartz) - 3:28
 "Don't Blame Me" (Dorothy Fields, Jimmy McHugh) - 2:53
 "Gone With the Wind" (Herb Magidson, Allie Wrubel) - 2:30
 "My Heart Stood Still" (Lorenz Hart, Richard Rodgers) - 2:32
 "If I Had You" (Irving King, Ted Shapiro) - 2:50
 "The Very Thought of You" (Ray Noble) - 3:29

Personnel 
Hank Jones - piano

References 

1976 albums
Hank Jones albums
Solo piano jazz albums